The 1994 Lothian Regional Council election, the fourth election to Lothian Regional Council, was held on 5 May 1994 as part of the wider 1994 Scottish regional elections. The Lothian result saw Labour further strengthening their already dominant position on the council. The council would ultimately not last long, with regional councils being abolished the following year.

Aggregate results

Ward results

References

1994 Scottish local elections
1994